Shakku is a 1988 Maldivian film written and directed by Ahmed Nimal. Produced by Mohamed Saeed under ADFA Films, the film stars Fathimath Rameeza, Asad Shareef and Ahmed Nimal in pivotal roles. During the shooting of the film, Nimal and Rameeza began a romantic relationship and got married soon after the premiere of the film.

Premise
Sameer, a short-tempered and underprivileged young man is accused of hitting an attractive wealthy woman, Zeena to whom he responds recklessly. She later apologizes to him and they reconcile and plan a trip together to his home island. The trip ends with them starting a romantic relationship though he had to stay back in his home island. Meanwhile, Sameer's friend, Nahid a single musician helps Sameer in settling down in his life after his marriage with Zeena.

Their life was filled with love and romance until Sameer starts suspecting Nahid having an affair with his wife. When he confronts Zeena about her relationship with Nahid, she becomes furious about his trust issues and moves out of their house in despair. Zeena, with the help of her family tries to get back with him. However, Sameer, being the stubborn husband, instead divorces her. Soon after, Zeena realizes that she is pregnant to a child of his. Meanwhile, Sameer becomes clear of all his suspicions but acknowledges that his time had passed. Having lost a devoted wife and a caring friend, Sameer seeks forgiveness from her family. Dejected he relocates to his island followed by another misery.

Cast 
 Ahmed Nimal as Sameer / Zameer 
 Fathimath Rameeza as Zeena
 Asad Shareef as Nahid
 Nazima
 Nafeesa
 Hamid
 Aishath Hanim
 Ahmed Naeem
 Abdulla Zaki
 Fathuhullah

Soundtrack

Reception
Upon release, the film generally received mixed reviews from critics while Ahmed Nimal's and Fathimath Rameeza's chemistry was particularly praised by the critics and audience. The film did "good business" at box office.

References

Maldivian drama films
1988 films
Films directed by Ahmed Nimal
1988 drama films
Dhivehi-language films